Marie Adrienne Françoise de Noailles, Marquise de La Fayette (2 November 1759 – 25 December 1807), was a French marchioness. She was the daughter of Jean de Noailles and Henriette Anne Louise d'Aguesseau, and married Gilbert du Motier, Marquis de Lafayette.

Life
They had four children: Henriette du Motier (15 December 1775 – 3 October 1777), Anastasie Louise Pauline du Motier (1 July 1777 – 24 February 1863), Georges Washington Louis Gilbert du Motier, (24 December 1779 – 29 November 1849), and Marie Antoinette Virginie du Motier (17 September 1782 – 23 July 1849) She was a great-granddaughter of Françoise Charlotte d'Aubigné, niece of Madame de Maintenon.

In 1795, the Marquise de La Fayette was imprisoned and about to be executed. Intervention by Elizabeth Monroe saved her. Mrs. Monroe visited the imprisoned marquise on the day before the execution and loudly announced she would come the next day. Not wanting to cut ties with then-diplomat James Monroe, France did not execute her.

Notes

References

 originally written in French

Further reading

Maurois, André (1961). Adrienne; ou, La vie de Madame de La Fayette. Hachette.

Collections
 Letter from Adrienne de Lafayette to her Children, The 17th Brumaire, November 1794
 John Jay letter to Adrienne Lafayette, 13 August 1785
 Gouverneur Morris letter to Adrienne Lafayette, 19 December 1796
 Lafayette Family Papers, University of Maryland
 National Museum of Women in the Arts 
Généalogie de Carné, Alain de Carné en novembre 2006
Neil Jeffares, Dictionary of pastellists before 1800, Noailles Iconographical Genealogy
The Marquis de Lafayette collection, Cleveland State University
Marie Joseph Paul Yves Roch Gilbert du Motier, Marquis de Lafayette Collection, Library of Congress

French marchionesses
Nobility from Paris
People of the French Revolution
1759 births
1807 deaths
House of Noailles
Grange-Bleneau, Lady of, Adrienne de La Fayette
Burials at Picpus Cemetery
Gilbert du Motier, Marquis de Lafayette